The 2018–19 season is Ittihad Riadi Tanger's 36th in existence and the club's 20th season in the top flight of Moroccan football, and fourth consecutive in the first division after promotion. The team participated in CAF Champions League for the first time in his history after winning the Botola title in the 2017–18 season.

Kit
Supplier: Gloria Sport / Club Sponsor: front: Moroccan Airports Authority, Renault, APM Terminals, Tanger-Med ; back: Valencia ; sleeves: STG Telecom; short: RCI Finance Maroc / League Sponsor: front: Maroc Telecom.

Season review

May

On 27 May, the club completed the transfer of 26-year-old Midfielder Hamza Jelassi from CA Bizertin on a three-year contract.

June

On 8 June, Ittihad Tanger and Hugo Almeida agreed to mutually terminate the Brazilian's contract.

On 12 June, the club completed the transfer of 27-year-old forward Omar Eddahri on a three-year contract.

On 14 June, Al Kharaitiyat centre-back Aurelien Josue Mohy signed on a season-long loan. And the club completed the transfer of the player Omar Najdi for one-year contract. And the club also announced the signing of the winger Abdelkabir El Ouadi coming from Raja Casablanca for three-year contract.

July

On 3 July, the club completed the transfer of 28-year-old Forward Salva Chamorro from UD Logroñés for two years.

On 7 July, Ittihad Tanger announces the termination the contract of the players Yassine Lebhiri and Khalid Serroukh at their request.

On 10 July, the club completed the transfer of four players; Mohamed Zghino from Mouloudia Oujda for five year, Abdelelah Erroubia from Chabab Houara for four years, Ayoub Gaadaoui from Chabab Atlas Khénifra for three years, and Benaissa Benamar from Jong FC Twente for five years.

On 15 July, Ittihad Tanger reached an agreement with the Saudi club Al-Raed FC to loan Ahmed Hammoudan for a year worth $350,000, with the possibility of buying the contract at the end of the loan period.

On 20 July, the club confirmed the transfer of Yasser Imrani to Wydad Fès on a season-long loan.

On 24 July, Ittihad Tanger announces the termination the contract of the players Pablo Ganet, Anas Aqachmar and Mohammed Amine Ennali.

On 25 July, the club announces the termination the contract of the player Omar Eddahri at his request.

On 25 July, The club loaned three of its players: Ayman Ben Ali and Zakaria Boulaich to Raja Beni Mellal, and Younes Ed-dyb to Olympique Dcheira for one year.

On 31 July, Ittihad Tanger announced that they had reached an agreement with Dragon Club for the transfer of Rostand Junior M'baï for a transfer fee of €100,000. The player will sign a contract for the next four seasons until the end of 2021–22.

August

On 7 August, Ittihad Tanger completed the transfer of the 24 years midfielder Soufian Echcharaf from Chabab Rif Al Hoceima on a two-year contract.

On 18 August, the club completed the transfer of the 28 years goalkeeper Issam Lahlafi from Chabab Atlas Khénifra on a three-year contract.

September

On 1 September, Ittihad Tanger completed the transfer of the 37 years midfielder Issam Erraki for one renewable season.

On 17 September, Al-Nassr midfielder Mohamed Fouzair signed on a season-long loan.

On 17 September, the club completed the transfer of the 26 years right-back Mohamed Hamami from Difaâ El Jadidi on a three-year contract.

On 25 September, the club announced Ahmad Al-Ajlani would be the new IRT coach following the departure of Driss El Mrabet.

October

On 11 October, Ittihad Tanger has introduced its new sponsor STG telecom in a three-year contract for 1,5 million dirhams.

December

On 18 December, Ittihad Tanger announced that Ousseynou Thioune would be departing the club after three seasons. Ousseynou joined Spanish club Tarragona.

Players

Squad

*

*

*

*
*

*

*

*

* Not in the CCL & CCC squad list.

Out during the season

Players in

Players out

Technical staff 

until 25 September 2018.

until 26 December 2018.

Statistics

Squad appearances and goals
Last updated on 9 June 2019.

|-
! colspan=14 style=background:#dcdcdc; text-align:center|Goalkeepers

|-
! colspan=14 style=background:#dcdcdc; text-align:center|Defenders

|-
! colspan=14 style=background:#dcdcdc; text-align:center|Midfielders

|-
! colspan=14 style=background:#dcdcdc; text-align:center|Forwards

|-
! colspan=14 style=background:#dcdcdc; text-align:center| Players who have made an appearance or had a squad number this season but have left the club
|-

|-
|}

Goalscorers

Assists

Clean sheets
Last updated on 9 June 2019.

Disciplinary record

Injury record

Pre-season and friendlies

Hamid El-Hazzaz tournament

Competitions

Overview

Botola

Standings

Results summary

Results by round

Matches

Results overview

Throne Cup

CAF Champions League

Qualifying rounds

Preliminary round

First round

CAF Confederation Cup

Qualifying rounds

Play-off round

See also
2015–16 IR Tanger season
2016–17 IR Tanger season 
2017–18 IR Tanger season

References

External links

Ittihad Tanger
Moroccan football clubs 2018–19 season